Helen Greiner (born December 6, 1967) is a co-founder of iRobot and former CEO of CyPhy Work, Inc., a start-up company specializing in small multi-rotor drones for the consumer, commercial and military markets.  Ms Greiner is currently the CEO of Tertill Corporation.

Greiner was elected a member of the National Academy of Engineering in 2013 for leadership in the design, development, and application of practical robots.

Early life and education
Greiner was born in London in 1967. Her father came to England as a refugee from Hungary, and met his wife, Helen's mother, while he was attending Imperial College (London). When Helen was five, her family moved to Southampton, New York, USA.

At the age of ten, Greiner went to see the popular film Star Wars. She has said she was inspired to work with robots by R2-D2 in the film.

Greiner graduated from the Massachusetts Institute of Technology with a Bachelor's degree in mechanical engineering, and earned her Master's in computer science.   She also holds an honorary doctor of engineering degree from Worcester Polytechnic Institute (WPI).  Greiner has also received an honorary degree from Clarkson University.  Her long term goal is to understand the nature of intelligence.

Career
In 1990, along with Rodney Brooks and Colin Angle, Greiner co-founded iRobot, a robotics company headquartered in Bedford, Massachusetts, which delivers robots into the consumer market. She co-designed the first version of the iRobot Roomba.

Greiner served as President of iRobot (NASDAQ: IRBT) until 2004 and Chairman until 2008. During her tenure, iRobot released the Roomba, the PackBot and SUGV military robots. She built a culture of practical innovation and delivery that led to the deployment of 6,000 PackBots with the United States armed forces. In addition, Greiner headed up iRobot's financing projects, raising $35M in venture capital for a $75M initial public offering.

She has worked at NASA's Jet Propulsion Laboratory and the MIT Artificial Intelligence Laboratory.

In 2008, Greiner founded CyPhy Works, creator of the Persistent Aerial Reconnaissance and Communications (PARC) and Pocket Flyer multi-rotor drones. She also served on the board of the Open Source Robotics Foundation (OSRF).  She left the company in late 2017, and subsequently resigned from her position on the board of directors to support a broader mission within the US Army.

As of 2018, she works as an advisor to the United States Army, within the Office of the Assistant Secretary of the Army for Acquisition, Logistics and Technology, (OASA(ALT)).  She was sworn in on June 4, 2018 as a Highly Qualified Expert (HQE) for Robotics, Autonomous Systems & AI for the Army (ASA(ALT)).

In September 2020, Greiner was appointed as CEO and Chairman of robotic gardening startup, Tertill.

Awards and recognition
Greiner was listed as one of the Global Leader of Tomorrow by the World Economic Forum in 2000.

In 2003, Greiner and iRobot co-founder Colin Angle were named Ernst and Young New England Entrepreneurs of the Year.  That same year, Greiner was named one of the “Top Ten Innovators” by Fortune Magazine.

Good Housekeeping named her "Entrepreneur of the Year" by and she was named by the Kennedy School at Harvard in conjunction with the U.S. News & World Report as one of "America's Best Leaders."

Greiner received she received the Pioneer Award from the Association for Unmanned Vehicle Systems International(AUVSI) in 2006.

In 2007, Greiner was inducted into the Women in Technology International Hall of Fame.

She received the 2008 Anita Borg Institute Women of Vision Award for Innovation for her work at iRobot. She has also been honored as one of Technology Review Magazine's TR100 "Innovators for the Next Century."

Greiner spoke at TEDxBoston in 2013, discussing how robots can save lives, performing work that is either too monotonous or dangerous for humans.

She received the DEMO God Award at the DEMO Conference in 2014.  Following this achievement, she was named a Presidential Ambassador for Global Leadership (PAGE) by US President, Barack Obama and US Secretary of Commerce, Penny Pritzker.

In 2018, she was named "woman of the year" at Wentworth Institute of Technology.

Greiner will be one of several speakers at GoFly's 2020 Final Fly Off.  Notably, she will be the only female speaker attendee.  This competition, in Mountain View, California, will feature teams from around the world to compete for almost $2 Million in prizes.

References

Living people
1967 births
American roboticists
Women roboticists
American women engineers
American mechanical engineers
20th-century American businesspeople
20th-century American businesswomen
21st-century American women